Symmastia is a condition defined as a confluence of the breast tissue of both breasts across the intermammary cleft that normally divides them. It can be surgically corrected by a plastic surgeon through symmastia revision.

Symmastia can either be a congenital anomaly or iatrogenic. Congenital symmastia is a rare condition with few published cases. Iatrogenic symmastia may occur following breast augmentation, forming what is also colloquially referred to as a "uniboob" or "breadloafing" as a result of the release of skin and muscle tissue around the sternum due to over-dissection.

References

Congenital disorders of breasts